Carlo Mammarella (born 29 June 1982) is an Italian former footballer who played as a left back.

Career
Mammarella started his professional career at Pescara, and also played for Fermana and Tolentino before making his professional debuts for Triestina in the 2005–06 Serie B season. He then returned to Serie C1, playing for Grosseto, Ancona and Salernitana.

In August 2008, Mammarella signed a contract with Lanciano. He achieved promotion at the end of the 2011–12 season, and extended his contract until 2014.

On 1 July 2019 Ternana announced the signing of Mammarella on a 2-year contract.

References

External links

1982 births
Living people
Sportspeople from Pescara
Footballers from Abruzzo
Italian footballers
Association football defenders
Delfino Pescara 1936 players
Fermana F.C. players
U.S. Triestina Calcio 1918 players
F.C. Grosseto S.S.D. players
U.S. Salernitana 1919 players
S.S. Virtus Lanciano 1924 players
F.C. Pro Vercelli 1892 players
Ternana Calcio players
Serie B players
Serie C players